Faqir Chand Aggarwal (born 1932)  is a leader of Bharatiya Janata Party from Haryana. He was a member of the Haryana Legislative Assembly representing Ambala city. He served as deputy speaker of the assembly from 1996 to 2000. Aggarwal was teacher by profession and he got the State Award for the best teacher in 1974 and National Award in 1981. After retiring in 1994 he entered politics.

References

1932 births
Living people
Haryana MLAs 1996–2000
People from Ambala
Indian schoolteachers
Deputy Speakers of the Haryana Legislative Assembly
Bharatiya Janata Party politicians from Haryana
Educators from Haryana